Bahra is a river of the Czech Republic and of Saxony, Germany. Its source is in the eastern Ore Mountains, on the Czech border. It flows into the Gottleuba, a tributary of the Elbe.

See also
List of rivers of Saxony
List of rivers of the Czech Republic

Rivers of Saxony
Rivers of the Czech Republic
Rivers of Germany
International rivers of Europe
Czech Republic–Germany border
Border rivers